Leblebi is a snack made from roasted chickpeas, common and popular in Iran, Palestine, Jordan, Syria, Lebanon, Iraq, Greece, Turkey and Bulgaria and sometimes seasoned with salt, hot spices, dried cloves, or candy coated. In Tunisia, the term refers to a very popular chickpea-based breakfast soup which also includes egg and stale bread.

Chickpeas used for leblebi are selected for shape, size, color, and harvesting time, and vary by cultivar. Generally, large-seeded (8–9 mm in diameter and 30–50 g of 100 kernel weight ), lighter-colored, round, and smooth surfaced Kabuli chickpeas are preferred; a thick seed coat and hull, easy to remove from the kernel is requisite. Harvesting time determines the tempering process and quality of leblebi; chickpeas are cleaned and classified by size, with undeveloped, damaged, shrunken, and broken chickpeas discarded.

There are two different kinds of leblebi- dehulled leblebi (Sarı Leblebi and Girit Leblebi) and nondehulled leblebi (Beyaz Leblebi and Sakız Leblebi) -introduced from Anatolia to North Africa, the Middle East, Europe, and some parts of Asia by Turks.  Production ranges from Turkey to the Middle East. In Turkey, the primary leblebi-producing region is Çorum, with a few additional local varieties such as Ağın Leblebi, Çorum Leblebi, and Mardin Leblebi.

History
Record of the origins of leblebi are scarce, though it is thought to date back to 1000–1500 CE in Iran.

Methods
The methods of leblebi production are an inherited tradition, with the steps and the equipment used varying. Utensils generally include tools for cleaning, grading, and heating, with preparation as follows:

 cleaning and grading
 soaking
 tempering (preheating and resting)
 boiling
 resting
 roasting
 dehulling

Etymology

Leblebi likely comes from the Arabic word , referring to Lablab, a domesticated pulse with edible beans – thus 'leblebi' means 'made from leblab'.

Beyond Turkey
Roasted chickpeas are a popular snack in Iran and throughout the Middle East, Central Asia, Greece, Sicily, Bulgaria.

Trivia
Ottoman-Armenian composer Tigran Chukhajian (1837–1898) composed an operetta titled Leblebidji Hor-Hor Agha (The Chickpea Vendor) in 1875.

See also
Lablabi (Tunisian dish)

References
 Bilgir (1976).Türk leblebilerinin yapılışı ve bileşimi üzerinde araştırmalar. Ege Üniversitesi Ziraat Fakültesi Yayınları. No:232, Bornova İzmir:Ege Üniversitesi Matbaası,106.
 Leblebi: a Roasted Chickpea Product as a Traditional Turkish Snack Food, Food Reviews International, Vol 20, Number 3/2004, pages 257 - 274, (2004).
 Comparison of physical properties of raw and roasted chickpeas (leblebi), Food Research International, Vol 31; Number 9, pages 659–665, (1999).

External link

Snack foods
Middle Eastern cuisine
Turkish cuisine
Arab cuisine
Western Armenian cuisine
Turkish words and phrases
Chickpea dishes